The expression New Year's is a colloquial term with unclear definition. It may mean any or all of the following:

  
 

 
 New Year's Day#Traditional and modern celebrations and customs
 
 
  (2 January)

See also
 New Year's Day (disambiguation)
 New Year (disambiguation)
 Happy New Year (disambiguation)
 Up Helly Aa